You or Me is an album by saxophonist Jimmy Heath featuring performances recorded in 1995 and released on the SteepleChase label.

Reception

Ken Dryden at AllMusic noted "Jimmy Heath is in top form throughout this quartet session".

Track listing
All compositions by Jimmy Heath except as indicated
 "The Quota" – 7:23
 "Rio Dawn" – 7:52   
 "Ballad from Upper Neighbors Suite" – 5:49   
 "Is That So?" (Duke Pearson) – 7:53   
 "Fungii Mama" (Blue Mitchell) – 6:53   
 "You or Me" - 7:15   
 "All Too Soon" (Duke Ellington, Carl Sigman) – 8:41   
 "Hot House" (Tadd Dameron) – 10:16

Personnel
Jimmy Heath – tenor saxophone
Tony Purrone – guitar
Kiyoshi Kitagawa – bass
Albert Heath – drums

References

SteepleChase Records albums
Jimmy Heath albums
1995 albums